The Lemhi Range is a mountain range in the U.S. state of Idaho, spanning the eastern part of the state between the Lost River Range and the Beaverhead Mountains. The range is located within Salmon-Challis and Caribou-Targhee National Forests.

Peaks

See also

 List of mountain ranges in Idaho

References

External links

Mountain ranges of Idaho
Ranges of the Rocky Mountains
Landforms of Butte County, Idaho
Landforms of Lemhi County, Idaho